Jingju Temple is a Buddhist temple located in Houzhai Subdistrict of Yiwu, Zhejiang, China.

History
Jingju Temple was originally built by monk Shegong in 867, under the Tang dynasty.

During the Dazhong Xiangfu period of Song dynasty, Emperor Zhenzong inscribed and honored the name "Jingju Temple"

Over the course of 1,150 years, the temple was destroyed and rebuilt many times. Most of the present structures in the temple were repaired or built in the 1980s.The Buddhist temple status was approved in 1992 and religious activities were revived.

Architecture
The temple was built along the up and down of mountains. Now the existing main buildings include Shanmen, Heavenly Kings Hall, Mahavira Hall, and the Buddhist Texts Library.

References

Buddhist temples in Zhejiang
Buildings and structures in Yiwu
Tourist attractions in Yiwu
20th-century establishments in China
20th-century Buddhist temples
Religious buildings and structures completed in the 1980s